The 2015 Kilkenny Senior Hurling Championship was the 121st staging of the Kilkenny Senior Hurling Championship since its establishment in by the Kilkenny County Board in 1887. The championship began on 19 September 2015 and ended on 25 October 2015.

Ballyhale Shamrocks were the defending champions, however, they were defeated by O'Loughlin Gaels in the semi-final.

On 25 October 2015, Clara won the championship following a 2-12 to 1-13 defeat of O'Loughlin Gaels. This was their third championship title, their first in two championship seasons.

Team changes

To Championship

Promoted from the Kilkenny Intermediate Hurling Championship
 Mullinavat

From Championship

Relegated to the Kilkenny Intermediate Hurling Championship
 Tullaroan

Results

First round

Relegation play-off

Quarter-finals

Semi-finals

Final

Championship Statistics

Miscellaneous

 The final between Clara and O'Loughlin Gaels presented a rare occasion when a set of brothers lined out on opposing teams. Brian Hogan was at centre-back for O'Loughlin Gaels, while his brother, Keith Hogan, captained the Clara team from centre-forward. During the course of the game the two brothers marked each other.

External links

 2015 Kilkenny Senior Hurling Championship fixtures and results

References

Kilkenny Senior Hurling Championship
Kilkenny Senior Hurling Championship